Poreč Trophy (through history held under names Trofej Plava Laguna, G. P. Istria, Trophy Riviera and G.P. Umag) is a road bicycle race held annually near the town of Poreč, in the Istrian peninsula. It is organized as a 1.2 event on the UCI Europe Tour. The race originally consisted of 5 challenges (6 in 2002); since 2004, the event consists of a single race.

Poreč Trophy

Winners

Challenge races

Poreč Trophy 2

Poreč Trophy 3

Poreč Trophy 4

Poreč Trophy 5

Poreč Trophy 6

References

External links
 2009 Poreč Trophy

UCI Europe Tour races
Cycle races in Croatia
Recurring sporting events established in 2000
2000 establishments in Croatia
Spring (season) events in Croatia